Dibenzpyrenequinone is a synthetic vat dye. It is a bright yellow solid. It can be produced by cyclization of 1,5-dibenzoylnaphthalene.  Dibenzpyrenequinone is a precursor to Vat Orange 1.

See also
Dibromoanthanthrone,Vat Orange 3

References

Polycyclic aromatic compounds
Diketones

Anthraquinone dyes
IARC Group 3 carcinogens
Vat dyes